The 1925 New Year Honours in New Zealand were appointments by King George V on the advice of the New Zealand government to various orders and honours to reward and highlight good works by New Zealanders. The awards celebrated the passing of 1924 and the beginning of 1925, and were announced on 1 January 1925.

The recipients of honours are displayed here as they were styled before their new honour.

Earl
 Admiral of the Fleet John Rushworth, Viscount Jellicoe,  – late governor-general of New Zealand.

Knight Bachelor
 Frederick Truby King   –director of the Child Welfare Division of the Department of Health.

Order of Saint Michael and Saint George

Knight Commander (KCMG)
 The Honourable Christopher James Parr  – Minister of Education, Minister of Justice and Minister in Charge of Police and Prisons Departments.

Companion (CMG)
 Captain Arthur Randolph Wormeley Curtis . In recognition of his services as private secretary to the governor-general.
 Frank Milner – of Oamaru; rector of Waitaki Boys' High School. In recognition of his services to education.

References

New Year Honours
1925 awards
1925 in New Zealand
New Zealand awards